Lebanon  is the county seat of Wilson County, Tennessee, United States. The population was 38,431 at the 2020 census. Lebanon is part of the Nashville Metropolitan Statistical Area.

History
The city was incorporated in 1801,  and was named after the biblical cedars of Lebanon (Cedrus libani). Local residents have called Lebanon "Cedar City", mostly a reference to the abundance of "cedar" (Juniperus virginiana) trees in the area. The city is home to Cumberland University, a small, private four-year liberal arts institution.

Geography
Lebanon is located at Latitude: 36° 12' 17.40" N Longitude: -86° 19' 21.00" W

Climate
Lebanon has a humid subtropical (Köppen Cfa) climate with mild winters and hot summers. Under the Trewartha climate classification, it is a temperate oceanic (Do) climate due to only 7 months having a mean 50 °F (10 °C) or higher.

Demographics

2020 census

As of the 2020 United States census, there were 38,431 people, 11,925 households, and 8,349 families residing in the city. The population estimate from the United States census has the population at 40,888 as of July 1, 2021. The population density was 692.0 people per square mile (267.2/km2). There were 8,693 housing units at an average density of 297.3 per square mile (114.8/km2). There were 11,925 households, out of which 30.9% had children under the age of 18 living with them, 47.7% were married couples living together, 15.0% had a female householder with no husband present, and 33.4% were non-families. 28.5% of all households were made up of individuals, and 11.1% had someone living alone who was 65 years of age or older. The average household size was 2.41 and the average family size was 2.94.

In the city, the population was spread out, with 23.9% under the age of 18, 11.2% from 18 to 24, 29.0% from 25 to 44, 21.7% from 45 to 64, and 14.2% who were 65 years of age or older. The median age was 35 years. For every 100 females, there were 90.6 males. For every 100 females age 18 and over, there were 87.1 males.

The median income for a household in the city was $35,118, and the median income for a family was $45,094. Males had a median income of $31,207 versus $24,420 for females. The per capita income for the city was $20,366. About 9.3% of families and 13.0% of the population were below the poverty line, including 16.0% of those under age 18 and 16.4% of those age 65 or over.

Economy
 Cracker Barrel was founded in Lebanon by Dan Evins in 1969 and has its corporate headquarters there.
 Lochinvar Corporation, a water products manufacturer, is based in Lebanon.
 The city threatened to sue Dell Inc. for eliminating 700 of the 1,000 jobs the company proffered as part of a tax deal on which the company later reneged.
  In 2015, Chinese tile company Wonderful Group invested $150 million to build their company's first manufacturing location in North America.
 The fraternity Sigma Pi was headquartered in Lebanon from 2013 until 2019, when it sold the historic Mitchell House to the City of Lebanon.
 In 2022, Tritium DCFC Limited opened a EV fast charger manufacturing plant.

Arts and culture

Lebanon hosts the annual Tennessee State / Wilson County Fair.

Education
The Lebanon Special School District, which includes most of Lebanon, encompasses four elementary schools and two middle schools. Wilson County Schools operates several additional primary and secondary schools in and around Lebanon, including Wilson Central High School and the newly reconstructed Lebanon High School. Small portions of Lebanon are in the Wilson County Schools for all years K–12. Schools serving those portions for K–8 include Carroll-Oakland School and Southside Elementary School. All of Lebanon is zoned to Wilson County Schools for grades 9–12.

Lebanon also has one private school, Friendship Christian School.

Lebanon is also home to Cumberland University, which was founded in 1842. The university has a rich heritage and has produced over eighty Congressmen and Senators such as Albert Gore Sr. and Thomas Gore. The institution has also produced a Nobel Peace Prize recipient, Cordell Hull, who served as Secretary of State from March 1933 to November 1944.

Media

Newspapers
 Lebanon Democrat, published Tuesday through Saturday
 The Wilson Post, published twice a week

Radio
 WANT 98.9 FM, country music/local sports and affairs
 WCOR 1490 AM (simulcast of WANT)
 WRVW 107.5 FM, licensed to Lebanon but primarily serves Nashville
 WTWW, shortwave on several different frequencies

Television
 WJFB 44, MeTV affiliate targeting Nashville
 WRTN-LD 6,  general/local programming

Infrastructure

Transportation
Interstate 40, runs south of the city, and has three exits that serve Lebanon. U.S. Route 70 connects the city to Nashville to the west and Smithville to the southeast. The western terminus of U.S. Route 70N is located in Lebanon, which connects to Carthage to the east. U.S. Route 231 connects the city to Murfreesboro to the south and Scottsville, Kentucky to the north. Hartmann Drive and Maddox-Simpson Parkway form a partial beltway around the city. The eastern terminus of Interstate 840 is located west of the city. State Route 109 passes west of the city and connects to Gallatin to the north. Secondary State Routes 141 and 166 also pass through Lebanon.

Railroad freight service is provided by the Nashville and Eastern Railroad short line.

Commuter rail service to Nashville began service in 2006 via the Music City Star.  Lebanon is the eastern terminus of the Music City Star commuter rail service which runs via scheduled service Mon-Fri. There are two times when trains operate outside the normal service. July 4 fireworks at Riverfront Park calls for a special event train. In addition, when the Tennessee Titans play at home, a special service called Game-Day Express operates.

Rail service began in 1871 with the now defunct Tennessee & Pacific Railroad, which ran to Nashville. The last original passenger train departed Lebanon in 1935.

Lebanon has a municipal airport referenced by FAA Identifier M54. Operating two runways, M54's main runway is asphalt. Runway 4/22 is turf .

Notable people
John Ray Clemmons (born 1977), member of the Tennessee House of Representatives, representing the 55th district, in West Nashville
Charlie Daniels, country music performer
Jimmy Duncan, U.S. Representative from Tennessee 
Ben Hayslip, Grammy nominated country music songwriter
Haystak (born 1973), rapper
George Huddleston (1869–1960), U.S. Representative from Alabama, 1915–1937
Albert Johnson, first black mayor in New Mexico
Coco Jones, Actress
Thomas Kilby (1865–1943), 36th Governor of Alabama
Reba McEntire, country music artist,"Queen of Country"
Marcellus Neal (1868–1939), first African-American graduate of Indiana University, Bloomington
A C Wharton, Mayor of Memphis, 2009–2015
Kenny Winfree (born 1954), folk music singer/songwriter

See also
 Lebanon station (Tennessee)
 Cedars of Lebanon State Park

References

External links

 City Government of Lebanon

 
Cities in Tennessee
Cities in Wilson County, Tennessee
Cities in Nashville metropolitan area
County seats in Tennessee
Populated places established in 1801
1801 establishments in Tennessee